Martin v. Wilks, 490 U.S. 755 (1989), was a U.S. Supreme Court case brought by Robert K. Wilks challenging the validity of race-based hiring practices.

Background
In 1974, the Jefferson County, Alabama Personnel Board signed a consent decree that required them to hire and promote African-American firefighters.  Wilks, a white fireman, took issue with the agreement, claiming that he and other white firefighters (who were not parties to the original consent decrees signed in 1974) were more qualified than some of the black firefighters receiving promotions.  The Supreme Court of the United States upheld the appeal of the white firefighters in a 5–4 decision on the issue of whether the white firefighters have a constitutional right to challenge the previously established decrees.

Opinion of the Court
Chief Justice William Rehnquist wrote for the majority.  They reasoned that a person cannot be denied his rights in a proceeding to which he was not a party.  Since the white firefighters did not have valid notice of the original proceeding, they should have their appeal sustained and the decrees overturned.

Justice John Paul Stevens wrote the dissent, and he was joined by Justice William Brennan, Justice Thurgood Marshall, and  Justice Harry Blackmun.  The dissent reasoned that the white firefighters should have had only limited means to appeal given that they were challenging the validity of the consent decrees but were not original parties to the consent decrees and that the majority overstepped the authority of the court.

Despite the racial overtones of the case and the sensitive public issues of civil rights and affirmative action, the core dispute of the case is one regarding proper procedure.  The Court declared that the white firefighters should have been joined as parties to the original proceeding under the Federal Rules of Civil Procedure Rule 19(a).

See also
 List of United States Supreme Court cases, volume 490
 List of United States Supreme Court cases
 Lists of United States Supreme Court cases by volume
 List of United States Supreme Court cases by the Rehnquist Court
Hansberry v. Lee,

References

Further reading

External links

United States affirmative action case law
United States civil procedure case law
United States Supreme Court cases
United States Supreme Court cases of the Rehnquist Court
1989 in United States case law
Jefferson County, Alabama
Firefighting in Alabama